William Erick Johnson (October 4, 1916March 8, 2002) was an American football defensive end in the National Football League who played for the Green Bay Packers.  Johnson came out of the University of Minnesota and played six professional games for the Packers in 1941.

References

External links
 

1916 births
2002 deaths
American football defensive ends
Green Bay Packers players
Minnesota Golden Gophers football players
People from Cherokee County, Iowa
Players of American football from Iowa